The Popular Dry Goods Company (known as The Popular and by its large Spanish-speaking clientele as La Popular) was a local chain of department stores in El Paso, Texas. It carried national brands of clothing, footwear, bedding, furniture, jewelry, beauty products, electronics, and housewares. At the time of its closing in 1995, there were four locations in El Paso at Downtown, Bassett Center, Northpark Mall and Sunland Park Mall. For much of its existence, The Popular was El Paso's largest locally owned department store.

History 

The Popular Dry Goods Company was founded in 1902 by Adolf Schwartz, a Hungarian immigrant who had previously opened two other retail stores in the area, Tres B (Buena, Bonita, Barata/Good, Pretty, Cheap) and The Fair which he had founded in 1900.  Schwartz closed The Fair in 1902 and it was succeeded by The Popular, which he opened with his nephew Maurice Schwartz and other relatives. In 1907, the Popular moved from the northeast corner of El Paso and Overland Streets to Mesa and San Antonio and consisted of three floors by 1914.

In 1917 Schwartz transformed The Popular from a general store to a modern department store with a six-story building on Mesa and San Antonio Streets.

Schwartz’s granddaughter Ann Goodman Schaechner, tells a story about Pancho Villa and Francisco Madero, opposing military leaders in the Mexican Revolution, visiting The Popular at the same time, "One was on the basement and the first floor and the other was on the second or third floor. A clerk recognized the foes and ran back and forth between floors attending the two men so that they would not bump into each other. Thanks to the observant employee, the two men never saw each other, and the store kept both good customers."

Adolph Schwartz died from a heart attack at the age of 74 on March 3, 1941. After the retirement of Schwartz' nephew Maurice, Maurice's sons
Herbert M. Schwartz and Albert J. Schwartz, continued to run the company.

The Popular's expansion began in 1962 with the opening of a second location at Bassett Center.  This was followed by a third location at Northgate (later Northpark Mall) in 1966, and then a location at Sunland Park Mall in 1988. 

In 1995, the devalued peso and Mexico’s recession along with the newly enacted North American Free Trade Agreement posed an economic strain to the region. All Popular stores were closed on November 6, 1995.  Dillard's purchased The Popular's credit accounts and Bassett Center store.  Sears purchased the Sunland Park location.  The remaining two locations were dissolved.

External links
 Archive photos: The Popular Dry Goods Co., El Paso Times

References

Defunct department stores based in Texas
Companies based in El Paso, Texas
Privately held companies based in Texas
Clothing retailers of the United States
American companies established in 1902
Retail companies established in 1902
Retail companies disestablished in 1995
Defunct companies based in Texas